Helichrysum thianschanicum is a species of flowering plant in the family Asteraceae. It is commonly known as silver spike or icicle plant. It is part of a large genus of over 500 species.

Description
Yellow clusters of flowers are produced at the ends of stems during the summer. Up to 30 yellow,  florets are in each cluster. In its native habitat, H. thianschanicum develops a finger-sized rhizome.

Taxonomy
Helichrysum thianschanicum was first described in 1880 by Eduard August von Regel. The specific epithet refers to the Tian Shan mountain range of Central Asia.

Distribution
Helichrysum thianschanicum grows on gravelly slopes and sand dunes in its native range of western China (Xinjiang) and adjacent Kazakhstan.

Uses

Cultivars
Helichrysum thianschanicum 'Icicles' is a cultivar commonly grown in the United States for its foliage. During the summer, yellow flowers are produced at the ends of the stems and are composed of up to 30 florets. They are not spectacular but do accent the gray-white foliage. H. thianschanicum is a perennial that originates from a mountain range with hot dry summers and cold dry winters and is difficult to grow in wetter climates. 'Icicles' is usually grown as an annual plant in gardens. It seems resistant to most insect problems.

References

 Regel, Eduard August von. Trudy Imperatorskago S.-Peterburgskago Botaničeskago Sada 6(2): 307. 1880.

External links
 Silver Spike - Plant of the Week

thianschanicum
Plants described in 1880
Shrubs